was a rural district located in eastern Aichi Prefecture, Japan.

As of 2004 (the last data available), the district had an estimated population of 16,703 and a population density of 43.84 persons per km2. Its total area was 381.06 km2.

History
Shitara District (設楽郡) was one of the ancient districts of Mikawa province having been created in 903 out of Hoi District (宝飯郡).  In the cadastral reforms of the early Meiji period, on July 22, 1878 Shitara District was divided into Minamishitara District and Kitashitara District. With the organization of municipalities on October 1, 1889, Minamishitara District was divided into one town (Shinshiro) and 22 villages.

Ebi Village was elevated to town status on April 28, 1894. In a round of consolidation, the remaining number of villages was reduced from 21 to five in 1906. On April 15, 1955, Shishiro annexed the villages of Chisato and Togō, along with the villages of Funatsuke and Yana from Yana District.  On April 1, 1956, the villages of Nagashino and Hōrai merged with the town of Ono and village of Nanasato in Yana District to form the town of Hōrai, leaving Minamishitara District with three towns and one village. In September of the same year, Ebi Town was annexed by Hōrai along with Yamayoshida Village from Yana District. On November 1, 1958 Shinshiro was elevated to city status.

On October 1, 2005, the town of Hōrai, and the village of Tsukude were merged into the expanded city of Shinshiro (formerly also a part of the district). Therefore, Minamishitara District was dissolved as a result of this merger.

External links
Counties of Japan

Former districts of Aichi Prefecture